The designation Kosmos ( meaning Cosmos) is a generic name given to a large number of Soviet, and subsequently Russian, satellites, the first of which was launched in 1962. Satellites given Kosmos designations include military spacecraft, failed probes to the Moon and the planets, prototypes for crewed spacecraft, and scientific spacecraft. This is a list of satellites with Kosmos designations between 1751 and 2000.

* — satellite was destroyed in orbit rather than decaying and burning up in the Earth's atmosphere

See also
List of USA satellites

References

 
 

 1751